Argentina Park is the name of a park in the center of Ljubljana, the capital of Slovenia. Formerly known as Lenin Park, it was renamed in the 1990s to commemorate the friendly relations between Argentina and Slovenia. 
A part of the park was renamed Park slovenske reformacije (Slovene Reformation Park) in 2000.

References

External links
 Burger.si
 Argentinski park, Ljubljana 

Parks in Ljubljana
Center District, Ljubljana